Coutarea is a genus of flowering plants in the family Rubiaceae. The genus is native to southern Mexico, Central America, South America and the West Indies.

These plants are woody trees and shrubs with oppositely arranged leaves and terminal inflorescences. The large, showy flowers are white, pink, red, or purplish, sometimes with whitish or greenish markings. The fruit is a woody, flattened capsule containing seeds with large wings.

Species
Coutarea andrei Standl. - Ecuador, Peru
Coutarea coutaportloides C.M.Taylor - Ecuador
Coutarea diervilloides Planch. & Linden - Colombia
Coutarea fuchsioides C.M.Taylor - Peru
Coutarea hexandra (Jacq.) K.Schum. - widespread in Latin America
Coutarea mollis Cham. - Brazil

References

External links 

 Coutarea in the World Checklist of Rubiaceae

Rubiaceae genera
Chiococceae